The 2010 Formula Renault 3.5 Series was the sixth season of the single–seater category. It began at the Ciudad del Motor de Aragón in Spain on 17 April, and ended at Circuit de Catalunya, also in Spain, on 10 October.

The Drivers' championship was won by Carlin's Mikhail Aleshin after a last–race title decider with Tech 1 Racing driver Daniel Ricciardo. The Russian claimed the title by just two points after both drivers entered the final race level on 128 points each. He received his prize Renault F1 drive on the first day of the young driver test held at the Yas Marina Circuit, Abu Dhabi on 16 November. Tech 1 Racing won the Teams' championship from Czech squad ISR Racing.

It was due to be the final season for the current Dallara chassis, which was due to be replaced by a new car, developed by Renault Sport Technologies, in time for the 2011 season. However, the series has extended the lifespan of the current car into the 2011 season to "avoid placing undue financial pressures on teams in the prevalent tough market conditions".

Regulation changes

Technical
 The engines were re–tuned from 8,200 RPM to 8,500 RPM.
 Boost control was banned.

Sporting
 The duration of the two Friday practice sessions was increased from 60 minutes to 75 minutes each.
 The grid for the second race was no longer decided using the reverse grid and SuperPole system. Each meeting (with the exception of Monaco) now featured two 30–minute qualifying sessions and two races of 44 minutes + one lap.
 During the Saturday of each meeting, the cars raced in a "light-aerodynamic" configuration, which was defined by Renault Sport Technologies.

Teams and drivers
 = Series rookie for 2010

Driver changes
 Changed Teams
 Esteban Guerrieri: RC Motorsport → ISR Racing
 Jon Lancaster: Comtec Racing → Fortec Motorsport
 Omar Leal: Prema Powerteam → International DracoRacing
 Daniil Move: P1 Motorsport → Junior Lotus Racing
 Anton Nebylitskiy: KMP Group/SG Formula → KMP Racing
 Filip Salaquarda: Prema Powerteam → ISR Racing

 Entering/Re-Entering FR3.5
 Mikhail Aleshin: FIA Formula Two Championship (MotorSport Vision) → Carlin
 Nathanaël Berthon: Eurocup Formula Renault 2.0 & Formula Renault 2.0 West European Cup (Epsilon Euskadi) → International DracoRacing
 Sergio Canamasas: European F3 Open Championship (EmilioDeVillota.com) → FHV Interwetten.com
 Jan Charouz: Le Mans Series (Aston Martin Racing) → P1 Motorsport
 Stefano Coletti: Formula 3 Euro Series (Prema Powerteam) → Comtec Racing; Coletti raced in Monaco for Prema in 2009.
 Albert Costa: Eurocup Formula Renault 2.0 & Formula Renault 2.0 West European Cup (Epsilon Euskadi) → Epsilon Euskadi
 Víctor García: British Formula 3 Championship (Fortec Motorsport) → KMP Racing
 Walter Grubmüller: British Formula 3 Championship (Hitech Racing) → P1 Motorsport
 Bruno Méndez: European F3 Open Championship (Campos Racing) → FHV Interwetten.com; Méndez raced for RC Motorsport at Motorland Aragón in 2009.
 Nelson Panciatici: GP2 Series (Durango) & Superleague Formula (Olympique Lyonnais) → Junior Lotus Racing
 Daniel Ricciardo: British Formula 3 Championship (Carlin Motorsport) → Tech 1 Racing; Ricciardo raced in Portimão for the same team in 2009.
 Jake Rosenzweig: Formula 3 Euro Series (Carlin Motorsport) → Carlin
 Alexander Rossi: GP3 Series (ART Grand Prix) → ISR Racing
 Dean Stoneman: FIA Formula Two Championship (MotorSport Vision) → Junior Lotus Racing
 Jean-Éric Vergne: British Formula 3 Championship (Carlin) → Tech 1 Racing
 Daniel Zampieri: Italian Formula Three Championship (BVM – Target Racing) → Pons Racing

 Leaving FR3.5
 Jaime Alguersuari: Carlin Motorsport → Formula One (Scuderia Toro Rosso)
 Bertrand Baguette: International DracoRacing → IndyCar Series (Conquest Racing)
 Marco Barba: International DracoRacing → European F3 Open Championship (Cedars Motorsport)
 Jules Bianchi: KMP Group/SG Formula → GP2 Series (ART Grand Prix)
 Max Chilton: Comtec Racing → GP2 Series (Ocean Racing Technology)
 Dani Clos: Epsilon Euskadi → GP2 Series (Racing Engineering)
 Chris van der Drift: Epsilon Euskadi → Superleague Formula (Olympiacos CFP)
 Fairuz Fauzy: Mofaz Racing → Formula One (Lotus Racing – Test & Reserve driver)
 Tobias Hegewald: Interwetten.com Racing → GP3 Series (RSC Mücke Motorsport)
 Michael Herck: Interwetten.com Racing → GP2 Series (David Price Racing)
 John Martin: Comtec Racing → Superleague Formula (Atlético Madrid)
 Mihai Marinescu: Interwetten.com Racing → FIA Formula Two Championship
 Alexandre Marsoin: Comtec Racing → unknown
 Marcos Martínez: Pons Racing → Superleague Formula (Sevilla FC)
 Miguel Molina: Ultimate Motorsport → DTM (Audi Sport Team Abt Sportsline)
 Guillaume Moreau: KMP Group/SG Formula → Le Mans Series (OAK Racing)
 Edoardo Mortara: Tech 1 Racing → Formula 3 Euro Series (Signature)
 Charles Pic: Tech 1 Racing → GP2 Series (Arden International)
 Frankie Provenzano: Prema Powerteam → unknown
 Pasquale Di Sabatino: RC Motorsport → Italian Formula Three Championship (Alan Racing)
 Oliver Turvey: Carlin Motorsport → GP2 Series (iSport International)
 Alberto Valerio: Comtec Racing → GP2 Series (Scuderia Coloni)
 Adrián Vallés: Epsilon Euskadi → Superleague Formula (Sporting CP)
 James Walker: P1 Motorsport → Superleague Formula (Liverpool F.C.)
 Adrian Zaugg: Interwetten.com Racing → Auto GP (Trident Racing)

Team changes
 It was announced in December 2009 that Prema Powerteam would be leaving the series to concentrate on their programs in the Formula 3 Euro Series and Italian Formula Three. Their slot was taken by Fortec Motorsport.
 SG Formula and KMP Group had split to form two new teams. However, SG Formula pulled out of the series just a week before the opening round.
 ISR Racing took over the RC Motorsport team's entry.
 Interwetten.com Racing, managed by Motorsport Consulting GmbH, were not selected for the series originally. They were later accepted as FHV Interwetten.com, managed by FHV GmbH, with Sergio Canamasas and Bruno Méndez driving.

Race calendar and results
The calendar for the 2010 season was announced on 25 October 2009, the last day of the 2009 season.

Season results
 Points for both championships were awarded as follows:

With each race having an individual qualifying session, the four–point bonus for pole position was removed. Also removed from the scoring system was the point for the driver who progressed the most places in each race.

Drivers' Championship

Teams' Championship

 Polesitter for each race in bold. No points are awarded.
 Driver who recorded fastest lap denoted in italics. No points are awarded.
 Driver who retired but was classified denoted by †.

References

External links
 Renault-Sport official website

Formula Renault 3.5 Series
World Series Formula V8 3.5 seasons
Formula Renault 3.5 Series
Formula Renault 3.5 Series
Renault 3.5